The Liver is one of the zàng organs stipulated by traditional Chinese medicine (TCM). It is a functionally defined entity and not equivalent to the anatomical organ of the same name.

In the context of the zang-fu concept
As a zàng, the Liver is considered to be a yin organ. Its associated yang organ is the Gallbladder. Both Liver and Gallbladder are attributed to the Wood element.

Regarding its stipulated functions, the Liver
governs "unclogging and deflation" primarily of qì and emotions. The free flow of qì in turn will ensure the free flow of blood, digestion, and water.
the free flow of qì and xuě (blood) is particular significant since TCM stipulates that stagnation of that flow will cause pain.
by association via its respective element each zàng organ is embracing a certain emotion. The free flow of these five (and other) emotions is thus linked to the unrestrained circulation of the qì of the zàng organs.
"stores" blood
opens into the eyes
governs the tendons
reflects in the nails
governs anger 
houses the hún ("Ethereal Soul")
Its associated body fluid is tears.<br/ > 
The Liver function is regarded to be strongest between 1–3 am. Its blood is responsible for the repetitive cycles of human life, for example menstruation.  The Huang Di Nei Jing describes the Liver as "the general of an army". It secretes bile, which is stored in the Gallbladder.  
A properly functioning Liver organ will ensure that the tendons are properly nourished and not too tense or gristly.  The normal direction of Liver qi is downward. When it "rebels" it can attack the Spleen, causing nausea and poor appetite. Dysfunction of the Liver typically presents as irritability, anger, headaches, dysmenorrhea, belches, bitter taste in the mouth, distension, pain under the costal arches, pain in the upper abdomen, tremors/numbness/stiffness of the limbs, blurry vision, or jaundice. Liver blood stagnation may lead to amenorrhea, blood clotting, or a bearing down sensation with menstruation.

Notes

References
 (2006-07-18), "", retrieved 2010-12-16 
Cultural China (2007), "Chinese Medicine : Basic Zang Fu Theory", Kaleidoscope → Health, retrieved 2010-12-21
Agnes Fatrai, Stefan Uhrig (eds.): Chinese Ophthalmology – Acupuncture, Herbal Therapy, Dietary Therapy, Tuina and Qigong. Tipani-Verlag, Wiesbaden 2015, .

Traditional Chinese medicine